Peter Opiyo Odhiambo (born 1 August 1992 in Bondo), nicknamed "Pinchez", is a Kenyan footballer. He primarily plays as a midfielder, currently turns out for Kenyan side Nairobi City Stars. He previously played for Kenyan Premier League clubs Tusker, Thika United and A.F.C. Leopards, for the Finnish Veikkausliiga side FF Jaro, and had loan spells at Gor Mahia and Indian side Viva Kerala.

Club career
Opiyo began his youth career with Tusker and signed for Thika United in January 2008. After only one year with Thika United, he moved to Gor Mahia in February 2009 on loan, and his loan spell with Gor Mahia was set to continue until 2010.

In 2011, he returned to Thika United  for the remainder of the year, before rejoining Tusker for the 2012  season helping the side to clinch their ninth league title. He moved to A.F.C. Leopards in 2013, helping the side to a second-place finish in the league and a ninth domestic cup. He scored the lone and winning goal against arch rivals Gor Mahia.

On 11 March 2014, Opiyo completed a move to Finnish top-tier side FF Jaro in a two-year deal. He made his debut for the club in their fourth-round 2014 Finnish Cup match against FC Hämeenlinna on 15 March, but could not help prevent the club from a 2–1 loss and an early exit from the tournament.

After flirting with AFC Leopards in the June transfer window, Kenyan international midfielder Peter Pinches Opiyo sealed a move to Qatar second division side Al Markhiya on 25 July 2016, a team he led to promotion at the end of the season.

Opiyo, who had been a free agent since his two-year deal with Finnish side FF Jaro expired in December 2015, was reported to be on his way to the 13 - time Kenyan Premier League (KPL) champions in the June transfer window but he intentionally refused to put pen to paper.

On 26 July 2018, Opiyo signed for SJK.  He left the club again at the end of 2018.

In August 2019, Peter Opiyo and Nigerian Uche Kalu signed a contract with FC Altyn Asyr from Turkmenistan. They were the first foreign footballers in the history of the club and the first legionnaire in the 2019 Ýokary Liga. Despite of having a contract paperwork complications saw him fail to join the team and in mid November 2019 he issued a termination notice and consequently ended his engagement with the club in early December to become a free agent.

After weeks of training with promotion chasing Nairobi City Stars, "Pinchez" joined the second tier side in January 2020 on a one-and-a-half year deal.

International career
He featured for the Kenya national team between 2009 and 2014. He was first capped on 14 Mar 2009 by German coach Antoine Hey as Kenya took on Iran at the Azadi Stadium in an international friendly. It ended 1-0 to the hosts. He was also part of the squad that won the 2013 CECAFA Cup on home soil.

Honours
Viva Kerala
I-League 2nd Division runner-up: 2009

References

External links
 
 Peter Opiyo - FoStats
 Peter Opiyo at soka.co.ke
 
 

1992 births
Living people
People from Siaya County
Kenyan footballers
Association football midfielders
Association football utility players
Kenyan Premier League players
Veikkausliiga players
Thika United F.C. players
Chirag United Club Kerala players
Gor Mahia F.C. players
Tusker F.C. players
Al-Markhiya SC players
A.F.C. Leopards players
FF Jaro players
Jakobstads BK players
Seinäjoen Jalkapallokerho players
Kenya international footballers
Kenyan expatriate footballers
Kenyan expatriate sportspeople in India
Kenyan expatriate sportspeople in Finland
Kenyan expatriate sportspeople in Turkmenistan
Expatriate footballers in India
Expatriate footballers in Finland
Expatriate footballers in Turkmenistan